Azovskiy is a surname, Russian and Kazakh Азовский. Notable people with the surname include:

Yegor Azovskiy (born 1985), Kazakh footballer
Maksim Azovskiy, Kazakh footballer

See also
Azovsky (disambiguation)

Russian-language surnames
Kazakh-language surnames